Matheus Salustiano Pires (born 19 April 1993) is a Brazilian footballer who plays for São Bernardo as a centre-back.

Career statistics

Honours 
Confiança 
 Campeonato Sergipano: 2017

References

External links

Matheus Salustiano at ZeroZero

1993 births
Living people
People from Pindamonhangaba
Brazilian footballers
Association football defenders
Campeonato Brasileiro Série A players
Campeonato Brasileiro Série C players
Botafogo de Futebol e Regatas players
Esporte Clube Vitória players
Oeste Futebol Clube players
Associação Desportiva Confiança players
Rio Claro Futebol Clube players
Associação Desportiva São Caetano players
Associação Ferroviária de Esportes players
Goiás Esporte Clube players
São Bernardo Futebol Clube players
Footballers from São Paulo (state)